= LR Swamy =

Indian writer (born 1946)

- ఎల్.ఆర్.స్వామి
- Born: 16 October 1944 (age 81); Thrissur, Kerala, India
- Employer: Andhra Petro Chemicals
- Known for: Translator, short-story writer
- Spouse: Bhattiprolu Naga Sundari
- Parents: T. K. Lakshmana Ayyar (father); Rajammall (mother)

Lakshmanayyar Rama Swamy (born 16 October 1944) is a translator and short-story writer from Visakhapatnam, Andhra Pradesh.

His work Sufi Cheppina Katha received the Sahitya Akademi Award for Telugu Translation of Malayalam Novel Sufi Paranja Katha, written by KP Ramanunni for the year 2015.

== Early life and education ==
Swamy was born to T. K. Lakshmana Ayyar and Rajammall in 1944. His mother tongue is Tamil.

His school education was completed in Thrissur, Kerala. He moved to Visakhapatnam after he got a job at Andhra Petro Chemicals.

== Career ==
Swamy has translated noted Telugu-language poets into the Malayalam language, including N. Gopi, Sikhamani, and P. Vijayalakshmi Pandit. He has also translated stories of Gurajada Apparao, Kethu Vishwanatha Reddy and Jayanthi Paparao into Malayalam. A translation of Mahakavi Srisri's Monograph and Divakarla Venkata Avadhani's Andhra Vagmaya Charitra are also in Swamy's credits.

He is president of the Mosaic Literary Organisation and Sahridaya Sahiti.

=== Telugu books ===
- Godavari Station (collection of stories)
- Aatavika Rajyam (translation of stories written by Tamil writer R. Natarajan)
- Sareeram oka Nagaram (translation of Malayalam poems written by K. Sacchidanandan)
- Sametala Kathalu (mini stories)
- Kathakasam (collection of stories)
- Sufi cheppina katha (translation of Malayalam novel written by K. P. Ramanunni)
- Pandavapuram (translation of Malayalam novel written by Sethu)
- Kathaswamyam (collection of stories)
- Loguttu Perumallukeruka (collection of stories)
- Folk Songs of Kerala (translation of songs written by K. Ayyappa Phanikar)
- Konda Dorasani (translation of Malayalam novel written by Narayan)
- Katha Keralam (translation of Malayalam stories)
- Mudralu (translation of Malayalam novel)
- Brahmarshi Sri Narayana Guru (translation of book written by T. Baskaran)
- Katha Vaaradi (translation of Malayalam stories)
- Kathadowthyam (translation of Malayalam stories)
- Spandanaamapinulaku Dhanyavaadalu (translation of Malayalam novel)
- Alaga, Alaga Kathalu (collection of Telugu stories)
- Janappaana (translation of Malayalam poem)
